Claudio Maffei (born 23 December 1999) is an Italian professional footballer who plays as a forward for Serie D club Bitonto.

Club career
Formed on Bari youth system, Maffei was signed by Pisa in 2018. After, was loaned to Serie C clubs Olbia, Lecco and Pro Sesto.

On 28 July 2021, he joined to Serie C club Fiorenzuola. On 27 January 2022, he was loaned to Viterbese.

Career statistics

Club

References

External links
 
 

1999 births
Living people
Footballers from Bari
Italian footballers
Association football forwards
Serie C players
Serie D players
S.S.C. Bari players
S.S. Fidelis Andria 1928 players
Pisa S.C. players
Olbia Calcio 1905 players
Calcio Lecco 1912 players
Pro Sesto 2013 players
U.S. Fiorenzuola 1922 S.S. players
U.S. Viterbese 1908 players
U.S. Bitonto players